The Sugarloaf Key Bat Tower, also known as the Perky Bat Tower, is a historic site in Monroe County, Florida, United States.  It is located a mile northwest of U.S. Route 1 on Lower Sugarloaf Key at mile marker 17. On May 13, 1982, it was added to the National Register of Historic Places. The tower was blown down during Hurricane Irma in 2017.

History

The tower was built in 1929 by Richter Clyde Perky, a fish lodge owner, to control the mosquito problem in the Lower Keys. However, when the bats were put in, they supposedly flew away, never to return.  The tower was built from plans purchased from a Charles Campbell of Texas, an early pioneer of bat studies.  The Hygiostatic Bat Roost, as Campbell called it, was intended to be a roost for bats that would eat the mosquitoes which spread malaria. According to at least some local folklore, the Skunk ape was responsible for some early damage to the structure and for driving off some of the bats.

Today

Two Campbell bat towers are still standing (out of an original fourteen worldwide) in the United States: one in Comfort, Texas; and one at the Shangri-La Gardens in Orange, Texas. At least one of the Texas towers has been internally reconstructed so that bats currently roost in it.  The ruins of a fourth Campbell tower, in Temple Terrace, Florida, burned in 1979 and now consists of the concrete base and legs.  Temple Terrace is in the process of rebuilding their 1924 tower. The Sugarloaf Bat Tower was toppled over on September 10, 2017, in the devastating winds of Hurricane Irma. It has not yet been decided whether it will be repaired or re-erected.

Cultural references
The Bat Tower is used as a setting in the Tim Dorsey novel Torpedo Juice.
Mentioned in the novel American Gods by Neil Gaiman.
Mentioned in the novel Gumbo Limbo by Tom Corcoran.

References

External links

Florida's Office of Cultural and Historical Programs
Monroe County listings

Bat roosts
Towers completed in 1929
Buildings and structures in Monroe County, Florida
History of Monroe County, Florida
National Register of Historic Places in Monroe County, Florida
Tourist attractions in the Florida Keys
Historic American Buildings Survey in Florida
Towers in Florida
Sugarloaf Key
1929 establishments in Florida